Wanderley Oliveira (born 29 March 1965) is a Brazilian boxer. He competed in the men's welterweight event at the 1988 Summer Olympics.

References

1965 births
Living people
Brazilian male boxers
Olympic boxers of Brazil
Boxers at the 1988 Summer Olympics
Sportspeople from São Paulo
Pan American Games medalists in boxing
Pan American Games bronze medalists for Brazil
Boxers at the 1987 Pan American Games
Welterweight boxers
Medalists at the 1987 Pan American Games
20th-century Brazilian people
21st-century Brazilian people